The following is a list of events, births, and deaths in 1856 in Switzerland.

Incumbents 
Federal Council:
Jakob Stämpfli (President)
Jonas Furrer 
Josef Munzinger 
Constant Fornerod 
Friedrich Frey-Herosé 
Wilhelm Matthias Naeff 
Stefano Franscini

Events 
 November 7 - Eterna is founded
 Ernest Borel is founded
 Carl Meissner discovers Conospermum mitchellii
 A revolt by Neuchâtel royalists sparks the Neuchâtel Crisis
 Credit Suisse is founded
 Gregory Haas and John Frey, two Swiss diocesan priests, arrive on Mt. Calvary after leaving Switzerland and establish a Capuchin Order in the United States
 The first part of the Olten–Lausanne railway line is opened
 Samuel Francis is relocated to Geneva to oversee the emigration of Latter-day Saints to the United States from Switzerland
 Switzerland opens a diplomatic consulate in Melbourne, Australia
 Arnold Escher von der Linth becomes a professor of geology at the École Polytechnique in Zurich

Births 
 April 7 - Ferdinand Schiess, recipient of the Victoria Cross (d. 1884)
 May 23 - Hermann Sahli, internist (d. 1933)
 December 6 - Louise Catherine Breslau, artist (d. 1927)
 December 9 - Ernst Brenner, politician (d. 1911)
 December 11 - Paul Sarasin, naturalist (d. 1929)

Deaths 
 William Bally, sculptor (b. c. 1799)

References 

 
Years of the 19th century in Switzerland